AEG Ogden was an Australian company that managed sports venues and convention centres in Australia and Asia. It was a joint venture between Australian interests and AEG Facilities (affiliate of the Anschutz Entertainment Group) and Australian investors.

In 2019, the company merged with the property management company SMG, and rebranded as ASM Global.

Venues

Arenas
 BCEC Great Hall
 Brisbane Entertainment Centre
 Cadillac Arena
 Cairns Arena
 Dubai Arena
 ICC Sydney Theatre
 Mercedes-Benz Arena
 Newcastle Entertainment Centre
 RAC Arena
 Qudos Bank Arena

Convention centres
 Brisbane Convention & Exhibition Centre
 Te Pae Christchurch Convention Centre (to open in 2020)
 Cairns Convention Centre
 Darwin Convention Centre
 International Convention Centre Sydney
 Kuala Lumpur Convention Centre
 Oman Convention and Exhibition Centre
 Sydney Exhibition Centre @ Glebe Island

Stadiums
 Suncorp Stadium

Theatres
 KCC Plenary Hall
 Perth Concert Hall

References

External links
 Official website

Service companies of Australia